I Worship Chaos is the ninth studio album by Finnish melodic death metal band Children of Bodom. It was released on 2 October 2015. It is the first album since 2005's Are You Dead Yet not to feature guitarist Roope Latvala due to his firing from the band in May 2015, making this the band's first album as a four-piece group with Alexi Laiho handling all guitar duties.

For the first time, the band did not use a commercial recording studio. Instead they opted to use a converted warehouse to enhance the ambiance of the sound.

In this album, the band used drop B tuning on most of the album and D-flat tuning on the songs "Morrigan", "Hold Your Tongue" and "Suicide Bomber" instead of drop C tuning and D standard used on previous albums. This also makes this the first album since Something Wild to use D-flat tuning.

Track listing

Personnel
Children of Bodom
Alexi Laiho – lead vocals, guitars
Jaska Raatikainen – drums
Henkka Seppälä – bass
Janne Wirman – keyboards, backing vocals
Production
Mikko Karmila – producer, engineering, mixing
Tuomas Korpi – cover art

Guest performers
Wednesday 13 - vocals on 'Mistress of Taboo' 
Kim Dylla - vocals on 'Mistress of Taboo'

Charts

References

2015 albums
Children of Bodom albums
Nuclear Blast albums